Ansar ol Emam (also Romanized as Anşār ol Emām; also known as Yangījeh) is a village in Alvandkuh-e Gharbi Rural District, in the Central District of Hamadan County, Hamadan Province, Iran. At the 2006 census, its population was 2,742, in 751 families.

References 

Populated places in Hamadan County